Laura Lynne Schuler (born December 3, 1970) is a Canadian ice hockey coach and former player who was a member of the 1998 Canadian women's Olympic hockey team.

Playing career
Schuler played one sport in high school. She was captain of the field hockey. She earned MVP awards in field hockey, ice hockey and soccer. Schuler won three Canadian national soccer championships with Scarborough United. Schuler began playing with the Toronto Aeros' youth organization when she was 11 years old in 1981. After three years with the Aeros, she played with the Scarborough Firefighters from 1984 to 1989. In 1994, Schuler joined the Toronto Red Wings.

Northeastern
In 1989, Schuler entered Northeastern University in Boston to pursue a bachelor's degree in cardiovascular health and exercise. As a rookie, she was the Huskies scoring leader in goals, assists, and total points. After the 90–91 season, she scored 20 goals and 13 assists. The following season, the Huskies had 20 wins and seven losses. Schuler accumulated 20 goals and 13 assists for 33 points. Once again, she led the team in goals, assists and points.

In 1991–92, Schuler was part of the Huskies third consecutive 20-win season (the Huskies went 20–5–2). Schuler had another season with 20 goals. For the year, she had 29 points.  During her final year of 1992–93, she was named team captain. As she was the team leader in scoring with 16 goals and 20 assists, (for 36 points), she suffered a season-ending leg injury. The injury occurred with seven games remaining. For her career, her numbers with the Huskies included 64 goals, (fifth overall), 57 assists (ninth), and 121 points (eighth).

Toronto Lady Blues
After her time at Northeastern, Schuler played for the Toronto Varsity Blues women's ice hockey program. In the 1997 OWIAA semifinal, Schuler's hat trick led the Lady Blues to a 4-1 victory over the Guelph Gryphons. Schuler would also score a goal against York University goaltender Debra Ferguson in the 1997 OWIAA gold medal game.

Hockey Canada
Schuler joined the Canadian women's national team in its first season, 1990. She captured gold medals at World Championships in 1990, 1992, and 1997. Schuler also played in the 1995 and 1996 Pacific Rim Tournament. Her final major international tournament was the 1998 Winter Olympics where she suited up for six matches.

Coaching career
In 2004, she became the head coach for the program at Northeastern University. From 1998 to 2000, she had coached the Stouffville Midget AA teams in Stouffville, Ontario from 1998 through 2000. In 2007–08, Schuler's Northeastern Huskies team had two members on the Hockey East All-Rookie team: Kristi Kehoe (led the team in scoring), and goaltender Leah Sulyma. In the summer of 2010, Schuler participated in the evaluation camp for the 2010–11 Canadian national women's team. She was a coach for Canada Red (the camp was divided into four teams, Red, White, Yellow, Blue). Schuler assisted head coach Ryan Walter for Team Canada at the 2010 Four Nations Cup.

Schuler was an assistant coach for the Minnesota–Duluth Bulldogs women's ice hockey program from 2008 until 2016.

On April 22, 2016, Schuler was named head coach of the Dartmouth College women's ice hockey team.

On July 21, 2021, the UMD Bulldogs announced that Schuler would be returning to the program as an assistant coach.

Career statistics

Northeastern

Hockey Canada

Coaching record

Awards and honours
Ontario Athletic Union, All-Conference, 1996
Ontario Athletic Union, All-Conference in both 1997
Eastern College Athletic Conference Coach of the Year Award in 2004
Northeastern University's Sports Hall of Fame (inducted in 2004)

References

External links
 
 

1970 births
Living people
Canadian women's ice hockey forwards
Ice hockey players at the 1998 Winter Olympics
Medalists at the 1998 Winter Olympics
Northeastern Huskies women's ice hockey players
Olympic ice hockey players of Canada
Olympic medalists in ice hockey
Olympic silver medalists for Canada
Sportspeople from Scarborough, Toronto
Ice hockey people from Toronto
Toronto Varsity Blues ice hockey players
Canadian expatriate ice hockey players in the United States